The Studio Boat (Le Bateau-atelier) is a painting done in the impressionist style in 1876 by the French artist Claude Monet. The work was executed en plein air in oil on canvas with a size of 72 by 60 cm and currently belongs in the collection of the Barnes Foundation of Philadelphia.

Monet bought the old fishing boat in 1872 soon after moving to Argenteuil. In his own words he said "a fair wind had brought me just enough money in one go to buy a boat and have a wooden cabin built on it just big enough to set up an easel". The floating studio enable him to paint views from the River Seine in the Argenteuil district  that were otherwise inaccessible, commencing with a series of paintings of the sailing boats at Petit-Gennevilliers.

Monet lived by his beloved Seine throughout his life and painted his studio boat on several occasions, both at Argenteuil and at Giverny, where he later lived. He was also pictured by his friend and protégé Édouard Manet working on the boat in 1874 in the company of his wife Camille.

Gallery

See also
List of paintings by Claude Monet
Claude Monet Painting in his Studio, 1874 painting of Monet in his boat

References

Paintings by Claude Monet
1876 paintings
Collection of the Barnes Foundation
Maritime paintings